The 2015 Sioux City Bandits season was the team's sixteenth overall, fifteenth as the Sioux City Bandits and first as a member of Champions Indoor Football (CIF). One of nine teams in the CIF for the inaugural 2015 season, the Bandits finished the regular season with a 9–3 record to earn the number one seed in the playoffs, in which they defeated the Amarillo Venom, 83–52 in the semifinals and beat the Texas Revolution in Champions Bowl I, 76–61.

The Bandits play their home games at the Tyson Events Center in Sioux City, Iowa, under the direction of head coach Erv Strohbeen. The team's offensive coordinator is Jarrod DeGeorgia, the defensive coordinator is John Zevenbergen, and the assistant coaches include Greg Stallman, Justin Hayes, and Spetlar Tonga.

Season summary
The Bandits' announced schedule for the 2015 season was not affected after the New Mexico Stars abruptly postponed their entry into the league on February 21, just one week before the season began. On March 3, the Albuquerque-based Duke City Gladiators were announced as a late entry into the league, partially replacing the Stars in the CIF schedule with a plan to play 11 games in 2015.

Off-field moves
After the 2014 season ended, the Champions Professional Indoor Football League announced it was merging with teams from other leagues to form a new league, Champions Indoor Football. The Bandits are one of four CPIFL teams to join the CIF, alongside the Dodge City Law, Omaha Beef, and Salina Bombers. 8 of the Bandits' 12 regular season games in 2015 will be played against these former CPIFL teams.

Anticipating crowds for their 2015 season opener, the Bandits offered a free shuttle bus service from downtown Sioux City to their home arena, the Tyson Events Center.

Roster moves
After six seasons leading the Bandits, quarterback Scott Jensen announced his retirement in December 2014. The Bandits signed Charles Dowdell away from the Bloomington Edge to lead the team in 2015. Dowdell was the CPIFL's 2014 Offensive Player of the Year and was named to the CPIFL All-Star First Team in 2014. The Bandits also signed wide receiver Frederick Bruno, the CPIFL's 2014 Special Teams Player of the Year, plus defensive end Marcus Miles and defensive back Andre Jones both formerly of the Lincoln Haymakers.

To fill out the 21-man 2015 roster, the Bandits held open tryouts in November 2014 and January 2015. The team's training camp opened in February 2015, leading up to a lone exhibition game against the Sioux Falls Storm on February 22 and the season opener at home versus the Omaha Beef on February 28.

Awards and honors
Each week of the regular season, the CIF names league-wide Players of the Week in offensive, defensive, and special teams categories. For Week 1, the CIF named quarterback Charles Dowdell as the Offensive Player of the Week and kicker Max Martin as one of two Special Teams Players of the Week. For Week 4, the CIF again named quarterback Charles Dowdell as the Offensive Player of the Week. For Week 8, the CIF named quarterback Charles Dowdell as the Offensive Player of the Week for a third time. For Week 9, the CIF named defensive lineman Sean Kelly as the Defensive Player of the Week. For Week 12, the CIF named kick returner Fredrick Bruno as the Special Teams Player of the Week. For Week 14, the CIF named defensive back Rahn Franklin as the Defensive Player of the Week and again named kick returner Fredrick Bruno as the Special Teams Player of the Week.

On June 6, the CIF announced the winners of its year-end awards. The Sioux City Bandits were honored for Fan Base of the Year and Media Relations of the Year, head coach Erv Strohbeen was named Coach of the Year, quarterback Charles Dowdell was chosen as the league's Most Valuable Player, and kick returner Frederick Bruno shared the Special Teams Players of the Year honors.

Schedule
Key:

Pre-season

Regular season

 Rescheduled to accommodate a high school basketball tournament

Post-season

Roster

Standings

Playoffs

References

External links
Sioux City Bandits at Our Sports Central

Sioux City Bandits
Sioux City Bandits
Sioux City Bandits